The Oceania Beach Handball Championship is the official competition for senior national beach handball teams of Oceania region. It was first organized by the Oceania Continent Handball Federation in 2013. In addition to crowning the Oceania champions, the tournament also serves as a qualifying tournament for the World Championships.

Champions

Men's division

Women's division

References

See also
 Oceania Continent Handball Federation
 Oceania Junior Beach Handball Championship - Under 19's
 Oceania Youth Beach Handball Championship - Under 17's

Beach handball competitions
Oceania Handball Championship
Recurring sporting events established in 2013